Triamudomsuksa pattanakarn Ratchada School (Thai: โรงเรียนเตรียมอุดมศึกษาพัฒนาการ รัชดา ) is a school in Bangkok, Thailand, established in 1961.

Schools in Bangkok
Educational institutions established in 1961
1961 establishments in Thailand
Huai Khwang district